Louis Vessot King   (1886–1956) was a Canadian academic and physicist.

Biography
L. V. King received from McGill University B.A. in 1905 and D.Sc. in 1915 and from the University of Cambridge B.A. in 1908 and M.A. in 1913. In the department of physics of McGill University he became a lecturer in 1910, an assistant professor in 1913, an associate professor in 1915, and a full professor (MacDonald Professor of Physics) in 1920, retiring in 1938 as professor emeritus. He was elected a Fellow of the Royal Society of Canada in 1915. He was elected a Fellow of the Royal Society on 5 May 1924. He was an Invited Speaker of the ICM in 1924 in Toronto.

King corresponded with Ernest Rutherford, Napier Shaw, Étienne Biéler, and H. T. Barnes.

References

1886 births
1965 deaths
Canadian physicists
Alumni of the University of Cambridge
Fellows of the Royal Society of Canada
Fellows of the Royal Society
Academic staff of McGill University
McGill University alumni